Brett Hartmann (born August 17, 1987) is a former American football punter and kickoff specialist. He was forced to retire after he suffered a career-ending knee injury. He was signed by the Houston Texans as an undrafted free agent in 2011. He played college football at Central Michigan University.

Early years
Hartmann attended Menomonee Falls High School in Menomonee Falls, Wisconsin and was a student and a letterman in football.

Professional career
Hartmann was eligible for the 2011 NFL Draft but was not selected. He was signed with the Houston Texans on July 28, 2011 as an undrafted free agent. He was released for the final roster cutdown, but was re-signed by the Texans after they released punter Brad Maynard. After playing in every game for the Texans, Hartmann suffered a torn anterior cruciate ligament (ACL) against the Atlanta Falcons on December 4, and was placed on injured reserve on December 6, ending his season. On November 15, 2012, Hartmann sued the county agency that operates Reliant Stadium, blaming "unsafe turf" for a possibly career-ending knee injury.

In 2012, Hartmann was suspended for four games by the league for violating the league's substance policy, and was replaced by Donnie Jones. Hartmann's suspension was later reduced to three. Hartmann was released during pre-season cutdowns, and as a free agent, his suspension was extended by eight more games on September 24, 2012.

References

External links
 

1987 births
Living people
Players of American football from Wisconsin
American football punters
Houston Texans players
People from Menomonee Falls, Wisconsin
Sportspeople from the Milwaukee metropolitan area